Julia Weissheimer Werlang Gama (born 18 May 1993) is a Brazilian model and a beauty pageant titleholder who was appointed Miss Brasil 2020. She represented Brazil at the Miss Universe 2020 pageant, finishing as the 1st Runner-Up.

Pageantry

Miss World Brazil 2014 
Julia represented her native country Brazil at Miss World 2014. The final show was held on 14th December 2014, in London, England. Having been one of the early favourites in the competition, Julia placed among the Top 11 semi-finalists. The eventual winner was Rolene Strauss from South Africa, who became the third woman from South Africa to win the title.

Miss Brasil 2020 
Julia was appointed as Miss Brasil 2020 on August 20 of the same year. She was chosen by the organization without a competition due to the COVID-19 pandemic.

Miss Universe 2020 
As the winner of Miss Brasil 2020, Gama represented Brazil at the 69th edition of Miss Universe 2020 pageant, held on May 16, 2021 at Seminole Hard Rock Hotel & Casino in Hollywood, Florida, United States. Gama finished in second place behind Mexico's Andrea Meza. This is Brazil's highest non-winning placement since 2007 when Natália Guimarães also finished as 1st Runner-Up.

References

External links

Miss Brazil winners
Brazilian beauty pageant winners
Brazilian models
1993 births
People from Porto Alegre
Miss World 2014 delegates
Miss Universe 2020 contestants
Living people